Gustav Kadelburg (26 January 1851, in Pest – 11 September 1925, in Berlin) was a Hungarian-German Jewish actor, dramatist, writer.

He made his first appearance at Leipzig in 1869, and two years later played at the Wallnertheater in Berlin. He was very successful in comedy parts, but abandoned the stage to write comedies and farces.

In 1908, The Manchester Guardian reviewed Der Weg zur Holle ("The Road to Hell"), his farce over three acts, then playing at the Midland Theatre. While chiding the lack of originality, the reviewer praised the pace - neither too quick to exhaust nor too slow to see the chinks.

Literary works 

Der wilde Baron (1880)
Goldfische (with Franz von Schönthan, 1886) (produced in English by Augustin Daly as The Railroad of Love)
Die berühmte Frau (with Franz von Schönthan, 1888) (produced in English by Augustin Daly as The Great Unknown)
 (with Oscar Blumenthal, 1891) (produced in English by Augustin Daly as A Test Case: Or, Grass Versus Granite; modern title: A Marriage Contract)
Die Orientreise (with Oscar Blumenthal, 1892) (produced in English by Augustin Daly as The Orient Express, translated by F. C. Burnand)
Zwei glückliche Tage (with Franz von Schönthan, 1892)
In Zivil (1892)
Mauerblümchen (with Oscar Blumenthal, 1893)
Der Herr Senator (with Franz von Schönthan, 1894)
Zwei Wappen (with Oscar Blumenthal, 1894) (adapted in English in the US as The Two Escutcheons by Sydney Rosenfeld)
Zum wohltätigen Zweck (with Franz von Schönthan, 1895)
Hans Huckebein (with Oscar Blumenthal, 1897) (English adaption: Number 9 – The Lady of Ostend, by F. C. Burnand)
The White Horse Inn (with Oscar Blumenthal, 1898)  (First English adaption: At the White Horse Tavern, by Sydney Rosenfeld)
Auf der Sonnenseite (with Oscar Blumenthal, 1898)
Als ich wiederkam (with Oscar Blumenthal, 1899, sequel to The White Horse Inn) (English adaption: Twelve Months Later)
Das Bärenfell (1899)
Die strengen Herren (with Oscar Blumenthal, 1900)
Das schwache Geschlecht (1900)
Das Pulverfass (1900)
Der neue Vormund (1901)
Das Theaterdorf (with Oscar Blumenthal, 1902)
Der blinde Passagier (with Oscar Blumenthal, 1902)
Familie Schierke (1902, later version Familie Schimek, 1915)
Der Familientag (1904)
Der Weg zur Hölle (1905) (produced in English by William Collier as The Girl He Couldn't Leave Behind Him)
Der letzte Funke (with Oscar Blumenthal, 1906)
Die Tür ins Freie (with Oscar Blumenthal, 1908) (English adaption: Is Matrimony a Failure?, 1909, by Leo Ditrichstein)
So bummeln wir (1912, musical comedy by Jean Gilbert)
Im grünen Rock (with Richard Skowronnek, 1913)
Die Schöne vom Strand (with Oscar Blumenthal, 1915, musical version of Hans Huckebein, music by )
Der Reisebegleiter (1917)

Filmography
Is Matrimony a Failure?, directed by James Cruze (1922, based on the play Die Tür ins Freie)
Hussar Fever, directed by Georg Jacoby (1925, based on the play Husarenfieber)
The Schimeck Family, directed by Georg Jacoby (1926, based on the play Familie Schimek)
The White Horse Inn, directed by Richard Oswald (1926, based on the play The White Horse Inn)
When I Came Back, directed by Richard Oswald (1926, based on the play Als ich wiederkam)
Fabulous Lola, directed by Richard Eichberg (1927, based on the play Der Weg zur Hölle)
Zwei glückliche Tage, directed by Rudolf Walther-Fein (1932, based on the play Zwei glückliche Tage)
The White Horse Inn, directed by Karel Lamač (1935, based on the operetta The White Horse Inn)
White Horse Inn, directed by Benito Perojo (Argentina, 1948, based on the operetta The White Horse Inn)
The White Horse Inn, directed by Willi Forst (1952, based on the operetta The White Horse Inn)
The Great Lola, directed by Hans Deppe (1954, based on the play Der Weg zur Hölle)
, directed by Georg Jacoby (1957, based on the play Familie Schimek)
The White Horse Inn, directed by Werner Jacobs (1960, based on the operetta The White Horse Inn)
Summer in Tyrol, directed by Erik Balling (Denmark, 1964, based on the operetta The White Horse Inn)

References

External links
Gustav Kadelburg in the Sceneweb database

 

German male stage actors
Austrian male stage actors
Austrian male writers
Hungarian writers
19th-century Hungarian Jews
Hungarian expatriates in Germany
People from Pest, Hungary
Jewish male actors
1851 births
1925 deaths
German male writers
Male actors from Budapest